Blanche Elizabeth Edith Henrey (1906–1983) was an English botanical writer and bibliographer, described in her Times obituary as "one of the most eminent among botanical bibliographers".

Works
 Flower Portraits, 1937
 Trees and Shrubs Throughout the Year, 1944
 British Botanical and Horticultural Literature before 1800, 3 vols, 1975

References

1906 births
1983 deaths
English botanical writers
English bibliographers
Women bibliographers